is a Japanese four-panel manga series by Amatou. It has been serialized since August 2014 in Media Factory's seinen manga magazine Comic Cune, which was originally a magazine supplement in the seinen manga magazine Monthly Comic Alive until August 2015. It was collected in eight tankōbon volumes. An anime television series adaptation by Studio Gokumi and AXsiZ aired between October and December 2018.

Characters

A 360-year-old vampire girl who came to Japan in 1986. As a never-aging-undead, she is incredibly weak to sunlight so usually stays awake during the night, and drinks blood, albeit refrigerated as she can't bear to drink it from humans. While often maintaining a refined appearance, she enjoys going to comic book conventions and ordering otaku goods.

A school girl who begins living with Sophie upon meeting her. She keeps a collection of dolls and is particularly fond of Sophie due to her doll-like appearance.

Akari's best friend who often worries about her.

Another vampire girl who is a long time acquaintance of Sophie's. She first meets Akari after having slept for over 100 years in her house in America before later moving into the neighborhood. Her character is based on Elizabeth Báthory. She falls in love with Hinata.

Akari's classmate. She's in love with Yū.

Akari's classmate.

Media

Manga
Ms. Vampire Who Lives in My Neighborhood is a four-panel manga series by Amatou, a Japanese manga artist who mainly draws adult comics. It began serialization in Comic Cunes October 2014 issue released on August 27, 2014. At first, Comic Cune was a "magazine within a magazine" placed in Monthly Comic Alive, later it became independent of Comic Alive and changed to a formal magazine on August 27, 2015. It was last published in the December 2021 issue on October 27, 2021. The first tankōbon volume of the manga was released on September 26, 2015; eight volumes have been published as of December 27, 2021.

Anime
An anime television series adaptation co-animated by Studio Gokumi and AXsiZ aired in Japan between October 5 and December 21, 2018 on AT-X and other channels and simulcast on Crunchyroll. Ponimu also simulcasted the series in Indonesia. The series is directed by Noriyaki Akitaya, while Tatsuya Takahashi handled the series composition, Takahiro Sakai designed the characters, and Yoshiaki Fujisawa composed the music. The series ran for 12 episodes.

Notes

References

External links
  
  
 

Anime series based on manga
AXsiZ
Comedy anime and manga
Crunchyroll anime
Discotek Media
Media Factory manga
Kadokawa Dwango franchises
Seinen manga
Studio Gokumi
Vampires in anime and manga
Yonkoma